Chengbei Subdistrict is a subdistrict of Chuanhui District, Zhoukou, Henan, People's Republic of China, located in the northern outskirts of the Zhoukou's urban area as its name suggests. , it has 15 residential communities under its administration.

See also 
 List of township-level divisions of Henan

References 

Township-level divisions of Henan
Chuanhui District